Kirkwood (formerly Kirk, Kirkwood's, and Roundtop) is an unincorporated community in Alpine and Amador counties, California, United States. Kirkwood's main attraction is the Kirkwood Mountain Resort. The town is accessible by State Route 88. Kirkwood is within the Eldorado National Forest. The population was 158 at the 2010 census. For statistical purposes, the United States Census Bureau has defined Kirkwood as a census-designated place (CDP).

History
Zack Kirkwood, a cattle rancher who had settled in the area, opened an inn, named Kirkwood's, in 1863 with the opening of the Amador/Nevada Wagon Toll Road, the primary route through the Sierra Nevada Mountains. The following year, Alpine County was created and the redrawing of the county borders placed the inn at the convergence of Alpine, El Dorado, and Amador counties (the borders were later changed so that the inn is no longer in El Dorado County, but the original signpost marking the intersection of the three counties is still in the building). Eventually, the inn became a fashionable summer resort.

After Zack's death, the inn stayed in the family and continued to operate until 1966, when it was sold to an investment group, who then converted it into the present-day Kirkwood Mountain Resort.

Geography

Climate
Kirkwood has a dry-summer subarctic climate (Köppen climate classification: Dsc). Summertime is very mild, with little precipitation, while winter is very wet and cold.

Demographics

2010
At the 2010 census Kirkwood had a population of 158. The racial makeup of Kirkwood was 153 (96.8%) White, 0 (0.0%) African American, 4 (2.5%) Native American, 1 (0.6%) Asian, 0 (0.0%) Pacific Islander, 0 (0.0%) from other races, and 0 (0.0%) from two or more races. Hispanic or Latino of any race were 6 people (3.8%).

The census reported that 134 people (84.8% of the population) lived in households, 24 (15.2%) lived in non-institutionalized group quarters, and no one was institutionalized.

There were 72 households, 13 (18.1%) had children under the age of 18 living in them, 26 (36.1%) were opposite-sex married couples living together, 1 (1.4%) had a female householder with no husband present, 2 (2.8%) had a male householder with no wife present.  There were 7 (9.7%) unmarried opposite-sex partnerships, and 1 (1.4%) same-sex married couples or partnerships. 31 households (43.1%) were one person and 8 (11.1%) had someone living alone who was 65 or older. The average household size was 1.86.  There were 29 families (40.3% of households); the average family size was 2.72.

The age distribution was 20 people (12.7%) under the age of 18, 21 people (13.3%) aged 18 to 24, 41 people (25.9%) aged 25 to 44, 51 people (32.3%) aged 45 to 64, and 25 people (15.8%) who were 65 or older.  The median age was 44.5 years. For every 100 females, there were 150.8 males.  For every 100 females age 18 and over, there were 176.0 males.

The homeowner vacancy rate was 5.6%; the rental vacancy rate was 10.0%.  96 people (60.8% of the population) lived in owner-occupied housing units and 38 people (24.1%) lived in rental housing units. 673 (88.9%) housing units were designated as seasonal use only.

2000
At the 2000 census there were 96 people, 19 households, and 4 families in the CDP. The racial makeup of the CDP was 87.50% White, 2.08% Native American, 2.08% Asian, 1.04% Pacific Islander, and 7.29% from two or more races. 5.21% of the population were Hispanic or Latino of any race.
Of the 19 households 5.3% had children under the age of 18 living with them, 21.1% were married couples living together, and 78.9% were non-families. 5.3% of households were one person and 5.3% were one person aged 65 or older. The average household size was 5.05 and the average family size was 2.75.

The age distribution was 7.3% under the age of 18, 62.5% from 18 to 24, 24.0% from 25 to 44, 5.2% from 45 to 64, and 1.0% 65 or older. The median age was 22 years. For every 100 females, there were 255.6 males. For every 100 females age 18 and over, there were 256.0 males.

The median household income was $46,250 and the median family income  was $0. Males had a median income of $17,917 versus $11,250 for females. The per capita income for the CDP was $14,853. There were no families and 0.9% of the population living below the poverty line, including 0.0% of those under 18 and 0.0% of those over 64.

Infrastructure
The Kirkwood Mountain Resort was built with a micro-utility providing electric power without connecting to the state electric grid.  The community was eventually connected when the town of Kirkwood took over the utility.

In popular culture
In episode 4 of season 2 of The West Wing entitled "In This White House", Deputy White House Communications Director Sam Seaborn references Kirkwood in a televised debate about school funding, though he mistakenly states that Kirkwood is located in Oregon.  His debate competitor, Ainsley Hayes, corrects him by noting that the town is located in California.

References

Pioneer Zack Kirkwood Was First To Tame This Frontier Mountain Wilderness

External links
Kirkwood Mountain Resort
 

Census-designated places in Alpine County, California
Census-designated places in Amador County, California
Populated places in the Sierra Nevada (United States)